The 2001 British Speedway Championship was the 41st edition of the British Speedway Championship. The Final took place on 26 May at Brandon in Coventry, England. The Championship was won by Mark Loram, with Stuart Robson winning a run-off against Martin Dugard for second place on the rostrum.

Final 
26 May 2001
 Brandon Stadium, Coventry

{| width=100%
|width=50% valign=top|

See also 
 British Speedway Championship

References 

British Speedway Championship
Great Britain